Clement Rodney Hampton-El, also known as Abdul Rashid Abdullah or Dr. Rashid, had been a member of the Moorish Science Temple of America and was convicted in the New York City landmark bomb plot.

Hampton-El was born in the United States in 1938.  He lived in an apartment in the Midwood section of Brooklyn for 25 years.  His neighbors described him as quiet, but nice - he used to buy candy for the neighborhood children. He worked as a laboratory technician in a Brooklyn hospital. 

Hampton-El died on June 30, 2014.

References

External links
 Legal case profile: USA v. Omar Ahmad Ali Abdel-Rahman et al.: 93-CR-181-KTD, MIPT Terrorism Knowledge Base

1938 births
2014 deaths
American Islamists
Muslims with branch missing
People convicted on terrorism charges
Converts to Islam
World Trade Center
People from Midwood, Brooklyn
Inmates of ADX Florence